Free Library may refer to:

 Akin Free Library, a historic eclectic late Victorian stone building
 Ames Free Library, a library in Massachusetts, United States
 Baen Free Library, a digital library
 Bennington Free Library, a public library in Bennington, Bennington County, Vermont, United States
 Bernard Free Library, the first free public library in Myanmar
 Carnegie Free Library of Beaver Falls, the first public library built in Beaver County, Pennsylvania, United States
 Crompton Free Library, a library in Rhode Island
 Enoch Pratt Free Library, one of the oldest free public libraries in the United States
 Free Library of Philadelphia, the public library system serving Philadelphia, Pennsylvania
 Haskell Free Library and Opera House, a neoclassical building
 Huntington Free Library and Reading Room, a privately endowed library in the Bronx, United States, United States
 Indiana Free Library, a public library in Pennsylvania, United States
 Kent Free Library, a public library located in Kent, Ohio, United States
 Little Free Library, a community movement in the United States and worldwide that offers free books housed in small containers to members of the local community
 New City Free Library, a library in New City, New York, United States
 Newton Free Library, the public library of Newton, Massachusetts, United States
 Parkway Central Library, the main library of the Free Library of Philadelphia, United States
 T.B. Scott Free Library, a public library in the city of Merrill, Wisconsin, United States
 TheFreeLibrary.com, free reference website that offers full-text versions of classic literary works.
 Williams Free Library, the first public library in the United States of America to have open stacks